Àkàrà (Yoruba)(English: Bean cake Hausa: kosai, Portuguese: Acarajé is a type of fritter made from cowpeas or beans (black eye peas) from Nigeria. It is found throughout West African, Caribbean, and Brazilian cuisines. The dish is traditionally encountered in Brazil's northeastern state of Bahia, especially in the city of Salvador. Acarajé serves as both a religious offering to the gods in the Candomblé religion and as street food. The dish was brought by enslaved peoples from West Africa, and can still be found in various forms in Nigeria, Ghana, Togo, Benin, Mali, Gambia, Burkina Faso and Sierra Leone.

Akara is an African cuisine that originated from the Yoruba culture, it is made from peeled beans (black eye peas), washed and ground with pepper, and other preferred seasonings, then beaten to aerate them, and deep fried in small balls.

Brazilian acarajé is made from cooked and mashed cowpeas that are seasoned with salt and chopped onions molded into the shape of a large scone and deep-fried in dendê with a wok-like pan in front of the customers. It is served split in half and stuffed with vatapá and caruru – spicy pastes made from shrimp, ground cashews, palm oil and other ingredients. A vegetarian version is typically served with hot peppers and green tomatoes. Acarajé can also come in a second form called abara, where the ingredients are steamed instead of deep-fried.

Etymology

Àkàrà is a Yoruba word meaning "bread" or "pastry", or the dish itself. The Brazilian term "acarajé" derives from either the Yoruba word combinations "àkàrà" (bread) and "onje" (food), or "àkará" (a round pastry) and "je" (to eat).Márcio de Jagun states that the word drives from the Yoruba àkàrà n'jẹ, or "come and eat àkàrà"; the phrase was used to call out to customers by women selling acarajé on the street.

History 

Akara plays a significant role in the Yoruba culture, as it is specially prepared when a person who has come of age (70 and above) dies. It is usually prepared in large quantities and distributed across every household close to the deceased. Akara also used to be prepared in large as a sign of victory, when warriors came back victorious from war. The women, especially the wives of the Warriors were to fry Akara and distribute it to the villagers.

Akara (as it is known in southwest Nigeria) a recipe taken to Brazil by the enslaved peoples from the West African coast. It is called "akara" by the Yoruba people of south-western Nigeria and by the citizens of Sierra Leone, "kosai" by the Hausa people of Nigeria or "koose" in Ghana and is a popular breakfast dish, eaten with millet or corn pudding. In Nigeria, Akara is commonly eaten with bread, akamu ogi (or eko), a type of cornmeal made with fine corn flour.

In Sierra Leone, akara is composed of rice flour, mashed banana, baking powder, and sugar. After mixed together, it is dropped in oil by hand, and fried, similar to Puff-puff. It is then formed into a ball. Akara is usually prepared for events like Pulnado (event held due to the birth of a child), a wedding, funeral, or party. No matter how big the occasion, this item is a classic in the Sierra Leonean community.

In Brazil

Acarajé sold on the street in Brazil are variously made with fried beef, mutton, dried shrimp, pigweed, fufu osun sauce, and coconut. Today in Bahia, Brazil, most street vendors who serve acarajé are women, easily recognizable by their all-white cotton dresses and headscarves and caps. They first appeared in Bahia selling acarajé in the 19th century. Earnings from the sale of acarajé were used both to buy the freedom of enslaved family members until the abolition of slavery in Brazil in 1888; its sale additionally served as a source of family income. The city now has more than 500 acarajé vendors. The image of these women, often simply called baianas, frequently appears in artwork from the region of Bahia. Acarajé, however, is available outside of the state of Bahia as well, including the streets of its neighborboring state of Sergipe, and the markets of Rio de Janeiro.

In Candomblé

Acarajé is an essential ritual food used in Afro-Brazilian religious traditions such as Candomblé. The first acarajé in a Candomblé ritual is offered to the orixá Exu. They vary in size based on their offering to a specific deity: large, round acarajé are offered to Xangô; ones smaller in form are offered to Iansã. Small, fritter-size acarajé are offered to Erês, or child spirits. Acarajé is used in Candomblé rituals in the states of Bahia, Rio de Janeiro, São Paulo, Pernambuco, Alagoas, Sergipe, and Maranhão. It is closely related to acaçá, a similar ritual food made of steamed corn mush.

Acarajé de azeite-doce

Acarajé de azeite-doce is a variety of acarajé fried in an oil other than palm oil; olive oil or other vegetable oils are generally used. Acarajé de azeite-doce is used in Candomblé offerings to orixás with a ritual prohibition of the use of palm oil. This variety is found in the states of Bahia and Rio de Janeiro.

Acarajé de Xangô (Sango)

Acarajé de Xangô (Àkàrà tí Ṣangó) is a variety of acarajé offered to the orixá Xangô, known as the òriṣà Ṣangó in the Yoruba culture. It is made of the same ingredients as the common form but greatly elongated. This variety is found on the ritual platter of amalá offered to Xangô. This variety is found in the states of Bahia and states of Bahia and Rio de Janeiro.

Protected status
Acarajé was listed as a federal immaterial asset (patrimônio nacional imaterial), by the National Institute of Historic and Artistic Heritage in 2004; the role of baianas in the preparation and sale of acarajé was recognized in the same act.

Nutrition 
Akara is a good source of proteins, vitamins and minerals such as calcium, iron and zinc, although its nutritional value is usually reduced by the presence of antinutritional factors such as phytates, fibers, lectins, polyphenols and tannins that affect minerals' bioavailability.

In popular culture
Akara (acarajé) was featured on the Netflix TV series, Street Food volume 2, which focused on Latin American street foods.

See also 

 
 
Tempura - Category of savoury fried snacks from Japan

References

External links

Recipe for Nigerian Chin Chin

Brazilian cuisine
Nigerian cuisine
Legume dishes
Ceremonial food and drink
Vegan cuisine
Beninese cuisine
Street food
Ghanaian cuisine
Brazil–Nigeria relations
Yoruba cuisine
Candomblé
Fritters